Sar Asiab-e Landeh (also Romanized as Sar Āsīāb-e Landeh; also known as Sar Āsīāb) is a village in Tayebi-ye Garmsiri-ye Shomali Rural District, in the Central District of Landeh County, Kohgiluyeh and Boyer-Ahmad Province, Iran. At the 2006 census, its population was 1,007, in 187 families.

References 

Populated places in Landeh County